Kanat Sadykov is the former Minister of Education and Science of Kyrgyzstan.

References

Living people
Year of birth missing (living people)
Kyrgyzstani politicians